This is a list of pies, tarts and flans. A pie is a baked or fried dish which is usually made of a pastry dough casing that covers or completely contains a filling of various sweet or savory ingredients. A tart is a baked dish consisting of a filling over a pastry base with an open top not covered with pastry. The pastry is usually shortcrust pastry; the filling may be sweet or savory, though modern tarts are usually fruit-based, sometimes with custard. Flan, in Britain, is an open pastry or sponge case containing a sweet or savory filling. A typical flan of this sort is round, with shortcrust pastry.

Pies, tarts and flans

See also

 List of baked goods
 List of breads
 List of cakes
 List of cookies
 List of desserts
 List of pastries
 List of puddings

References

External links
 25 Perfect Pies. Martha Stewart.

 
Pies
Pies